The Church of Jesus Christ of Latter-day Saints in Oregon refers to the Church of Jesus Christ of Latter-day Saints (LDS Church) and its members in Oregon. Oregon has the 9th most members of the Church of any U.S. state. Members have had considerable influence in the state throughout its contemporary history and many influential Mormons have come from Oregon including Senator Gordon H. Smith.

History

E. Kimbark MacColl's analysis of Portland, Oregon, history states "Portland was well endowed with churches, with approximately one for every 600 residents" in the 1890s. In his survey of six leading denominations and all 25 missions, no mention was made of LDS Church denominations or missions. A chapel was built in Portland in 1929, ready for an open house on February 15–17, 1929. The building "carried the architectural scheme of an old English manor, being constructed of dense lava stone and bricks of the clinker type, and is declared particularly suited to western Oregon climate and surroundings." It included a maternity room and a basement with 14 classrooms. The architect was C. R. Kaufman, and construction had begun on August 1, 1928.

County Statistics
List of LDS Church adherents in each county as of 2010 according to the Association of Religion Data Archives: Note: Each county adherent count reflects meetinghouse location of congregation and not by location of residence. Census count reflects location of residence which may skew percent of population where adherents reside in a different county as their congregational meetinghouse.

Missions

On July 26, 1897, the Northwestern States Mission (headquartered in Portland) was organized to search out Latter-day Saints who had moved to Oregon, Washington, and Montana. On June 10, 1970, its name changed to the Oregon Mission and ultimately the Oregon Portland Mission on June 20, 1974.  On July 1, 1990, the Eugene Oregon Mission was organized; and in July 2013, the Salem Oregon Mission was organized.

In addition to these missions the Idaho Boise Mission covers the eastern portion of the state while the Washington Kennewick, Washington Vancouver, and Washington Yakima covers portions of Northern Oregon

Notable Oregonian Saints 

See Also: List of Latter Day Saints and Category:Latter Day Saints from Oregon
 Gordon H. Smith, US Senator (R), 1997-2009
 Dennis Richardson, Oregon Secretary of State (R), 2017–19
 Tom Butler, Former State Representative, (R-HD60)
 Shawn Lindsay, Former State Representative, (R-HD30)
 Ammon Bundy, Activist and leader of the Malheur Wildlife Refuge Standoff
 Danny Ainge, Basketball player and executive
 Rich Vial, Former Deputy Secretary of State, Nonpartisan candidate for Oregon Secretary of State in 2020
 Erin Chambers, Actress
 Jacoby Ellsbury, Professional baseball player (Boston, New York - Yankees)
 Jeremy Guthrie, Professional baseball player (multiple teams)
 Dale Murphy, Professional baseball player (Atlanta, Philadelphia, Colorado)

Temples

Oregon currently has two operating temples and one under construction.  Two other temples have temple districts reaching into Oregon.

Gallery

See also 

 The Church of Jesus Christ of Latter-day Saints membership statistics (United States)
 Religion in Oregon
 Religion in Portland, Oregon

References

External links
 Newsroom (Oregon), current membership statistics
 ComeUntoChrist.org Latter-day Saints Visitor site
 The Church of Jesus Christ of Latter-day Saints Official site
 Deseret News 2010 Church Almanac, includes brief history of the LDS Church in Oregon.

Latter Day Saint movement in Oregon